The periodic table of topological invariants is an application of topology to physics. It indicates the group of topological invariant for topological insulators and superconductors in each dimension and in each discrete symmetry class.

Discrete symmetry classes

There are ten discrete symmetry classes of topological insulators and superconductors, corresponding to the ten Altland–Zirnbauer classes of random matrices.

Again either  or  depending on what  is.

It is evident that if two of these three symmetries are present, then the third is also present, due to the relation .

The aforementioned discrete symmetries label 10 distinct discrete symmetry classes, which coincide with the Altland–Zirnbauer classes of random matrices.

Equivalence classes of Hamiltonians

A bulk Hamiltonian in a particular symmetry group is restricted to be a Hermitian matrix with no zero-energy eigenvalues (i.e. so that the spectrum is "gapped" and the system is a bulk insulator) satisfying the symmetry constraints of the group. In the case of  dimensions, this Hamiltonian is a continuous  function  of the  parameters in the Bloch momentum vector  in the  Brillouin zone; then the symmetry constraints must hold for all .

However, it may also turn out that there is no such continuous deformation. in this case, physically if two materials with bulk Hamiltonians  and  respectively neighbour each other with an edge between them, when one continuously moves across the edge one must encounter a zero eigenvalue (as there is no continuous transformation that avoids this). This may manifest as a gapless zero energy edge mode or an electric current that only flows along the edge.

An interesting question is to ask, given a symmetry class and a dimension of the Brillouin zone, what are all the equivalence classes of Hamiltonians. Each equivalence class can be labeled by a topological invariant; two Hamiltonians whose topological invariant are different cannot be deformed into each other and belong to different equivalence classes.

Classifying spaces of Hamiltonians 

For each of the symmetry classes, the question can be simplified by deforming the Hamiltonian into a "projective" Hamiltonian, and considering the symmetric space in which such Hamiltonians live. These classifying spaces are shown for each symmetry class:

For example, a (real symmetric) Hamiltonian in symmetry class AI can have its  positive eigenvalues deformed to +1 and its  negative eigenvalues deformed to -1; the resulting such matrices are described by the union of real Grassmannians

Classification of invariants 

The strong topological invariants of a many-band system in  dimensions can be labeled by the elements of the -th homotopy group of the symmetric space. These groups are displayed in this table, called the periodic table of topological insulators:

There may also exist weak topological invariants (associated to the fact that the suspension of the Brillouin zone is in fact equivalent to a  sphere wedged with lower-dimensional spheres), which are not included in this table.

The table also is periodic in the sense that the group of invariants in  dimensions is the same as the group of invariants in  dimensions. In the case of no antiunitary symmetries, the invariant groups are periodic in dimension by 2.

For nontrivial symmetry classes, the actual invariant can be defined by one of the following integrals over all or part of the Brillouin zone: the Chern number, the Wess Zumino winding number, the Chern–Simons invariant, the Fu–Kane invariant.

Dimensional reduction and Bott Clock

The periodic table also displays a peculiar property: the invariant groups in  dimensions are identical to those in  dimensions but in a different symmetry class. Among the complex symmetry classes, the invariant group for A in  dimensions is the same as that for AIII in  dimensions, and vice versa. One can also imagine arranging each of the eight real symmetry classes on the Cartesian plane such that the  coordinate is  if time reversal symmetry is present and  if it is absent, and the  coordinate is  if particle hole symmetry is present and  if it is absent. Then the invariant group in  dimensions for a certain real symmetry class is the same as the invariant group in  dimensions for the symmetry class directly one space clockwise. This phenomenon was termed the "Bott Clock" by Alexei Kitaev, in reference to the Bott periodicity theorem.

The Bott Clock can be understood by considering the problem of Clifford algebra extensions. Near an interface between two inequivalent bulk materials, the Hamiltonian approaches a gap closing. To lowest order expansion in momentum slightly away from the gap closing, the Hamiltonian takes the form of a Dirac Hamiltonian . Here,  are a representation of the Clifford Algebra , while  is an added "mass term" that and anticommutes with the rest of the Hamiltonian and vanishes at the interface (thus giving the interface a gapless edge mode at ). The  term for the Hamiltonian on one side of the interface cannot be continuously deformed into the  term for the Hamiltonian on the other side of the interface.

See also 

 Symmetry-protected topological order

References

External links
 

Insulators
Superconductors
Topology
Condensed matter physics